USS Selfridge is the name of two ships in the United States Navy.

United States Navy ship names